The 2015 Aegon Manchester Trophy was a professional tennis tournament played on grass courts. It was the 1st edition of the revived tournament, forming part of the 2015 ATP Challenger Tour. It took place in Manchester, United Kingdom between 1 and 7 June 2015.

Singles main-draw entrants

Seeds

 1 Rankings are as of May 25, 2015.

Other entrants
The following players received wildcards into the singles main draw:
  Daniel Cox
  Joshua Milton
  Daniel Smethurst
  Marcus Willis

The following players received entry as alternates:
  Jordan Thompson
  Edward Corrie

The following players received entry from the qualifying draw:
  Alex Bolt
  Fabrice Martin
  Frederik Nielsen
  Matt Reid

Doubles main-draw entrants

Seeds

1 Rankings as of May 25, 2015.

Other entrants
The following pairs received wildcards into the doubles main draw:
  Luke Bambridge /  Liam Broady
  Scott Clayton /  Richard Gabb
  Edward Corrie /  Daniel Smethurst

Champions

Singles

 Sam Groth def.  Luke Saville, 7–5, 6–1

Doubles

 Chris Guccione /  André Sá def.  Raven Klaasen /  Rajeev Ram by walkover

External links
 Official website

Aegon Manchester Trophy
2015
Aegon Manchester Trophy
Aegon Manchester Trophy